Kakha Vakhtangishvili (born 2 April 1970) is a Georgian luger. He competed in the men's doubles event at the 1994 Winter Olympics.

References

External links
 

1970 births
Living people
Male lugers from Georgia (country)
Olympic lugers of Georgia (country)
Lugers at the 1994 Winter Olympics
People from Samtskhe–Javakheti